Sir Charles William Davidson KBE (14 September 1897 – 29 November 1985) was an Australian politician. He was deputy leader of the Country Party from 1956 to 1963 and represented the party in federal parliament from 1946 to 1963. He served as Postmaster-General of Australia (1956–1963) and Minister for the Navy (1956–1958) in the Menzies Government.

Early life
Davidson was born on 14 September 1897 in Toowong, Queensland. He was the third child of Marion (née Perry) and Alexander Black Davidson. His mother born in England and his father in Scotland. Davidson attended Townsville Grammar School until 1914 and then found work as a stockman in North Queensland. He enlisted in the Australian Imperial Force in February 1916 and served on the Western Front with the 42nd Battalion. He was wounded in action in September 1918 and returned to Australia.

Military service
He served in World War I.

During World War II, he served in the 42nd Battalion of the Australian Army in New Guinea, rising to the rank of lieutenant-colonel.  He was twice mentioned in despatches and was made an Officer of the Order of the British Empire (Military) in March 1945.

Political career

Davidson was elected to the House of Representatives at the 1946 federal election, defeating Frank Forde – the incumbent Australian Labor Party deputy leader and a former prime minister – in the Division of Capricornia. He received a dual endorsement from the Country Party and the Liberal Party (in the form of the Queensland People's Party). He joined the parliamentary Country Party after his election.

In March 1947, Davidson was one of several MPs to boycott the swearing-in of William McKell as Governor-General of Australia, in protest at the perceived partisanship of his appointment. At the 1949 election, following a redistribution, he  was elected the member for the new seat of Dawson.  He was Postmaster-General from 1956 to 1963 and Minister for the Navy from 1956 to 1958.  
In 1958 he was elected deputy leader of the Country Party succeeding John McEwen who had become leader.

He retired at the 1963 election.

Davidson was made a Knight Commander of the Order of the British Empire in June 1964.  He died in 1985 and was survived by his wife, a son and two daughters.

Notes

1897 births
1985 deaths
Australian colonels
Australian military personnel of World War I
Australian Army personnel of World War II
Australian Knights Commander of the Order of the British Empire
Australian politicians awarded knighthoods
Liberal Party of Australia members of the Parliament of Australia
Members of the Australian House of Representatives
Members of the Australian House of Representatives for Capricornia
Members of the Australian House of Representatives for Dawson
Members of the Cabinet of Australia
National Party of Australia members of the Parliament of Australia
20th-century Australian politicians